Fanshawe (less commonly Fanshaw) can refer to:

Places 
 Fanshawe, Oklahoma, a town in the United States
 Fanshawe College, a school in London, Ontario, Canada
 Fanshawe Dam in London, Ontario
 Fanshawe Lake in London, Ontario
 Fanshawe Pioneer Village in London, Ontario

Other uses 
 Fanshawe (surname)
 Featherstonhaugh, of the same pronunciation as Fanshawe
 Anthony Royle, Baron Fanshawe of Richmond (1927–2001)
 Fanshawe (novel), a 19th-century novel by Nathaniel Hawthorne
 USS Fanshaw Bay (CVE-70), US navy aircraft carrier